In mathematics, the Laplace–Carson transform, named after Pierre Simon Laplace and John Renshaw Carson, is an integral transform with significant applications in the field of physics and engineering, particularly in the field of railway engineering.

Definition 
Let  be a function and  a complex variable.  The Laplace–Carson transform is defined as:

 

The inverse Laplace–Carson transform is:

where  is a real-valued constant,  refers to the imaginary axis, which indicates the integral is carried out along a straight line parallel to the imaginary axis lying to the right of all the singularities of the following expression:

See also 
Laplace transform

References 

Integral transforms
Differential equations
Fourier analysis
Transforms